Nils Hasselskog (1892–1936) was a Swedish poet, writer and humourist. He debuted as a writer for Grönköpings Veckoblad in 1925. Hasselskog's years at the magazine are considered its artistic peak. He was the creator of the parody language Transpiranto.

References

Swedish-language writers
Swedish male writers
1892 births
1936 deaths